Aldo may refer to:

 Aldo (given name), male given name 
 Aldo (footballer, born 1977)
 Aldo (footballer, born 1988)
 Aldo Group, a worldwide chain of shoe stores
 Aldosterone in shorthand
 Aldo Bonzi, a town in Argentina